Michael Stedman may refer to:

 Michael Stedman (journalist) (born 1985), Australian political reporter
 Michael Stedman, former managing director of NHNZ